Ioannis Diakos (Greek: Ιωάννης Διάκος, 1805-1887) was a Greek revolutionary leader during the Greek War of Independence.  He was a chief of Pyrgos and battled during the Greek War of Independence and at the time, he was a general of Pyrgos.  Petros Mitzos killed his father in 1823 in which that in the political battlefield he also killed Stamatis Krestenitis.

References
The first version of the article is translated and is based from the article at the Greek Wikipedia (el:Main Page)

1805 births
1887 deaths
Greek military leaders of the Greek War of Independence
People from Pyrgos, Elis